Hustler is a monthly pornographic magazine published by Larry Flynt Publications (LFP) in the United States. Introduced in 1974, it was a step forward from the Hustler Newsletter, originally conceived by founder Larry Flynt as cheap advertising for his strip club businesses at the time. The magazine grew from an uncertain start to a peak circulation of around 3 million in the early 1980s; it has since dropped to approximately 500,000. Hustler was among the first major US-based magazines to feature graphic photos of female genitalia and simulated sex acts, in contrast with relatively modest publications such as  Playboy. In the 1990s, Hustler, like several of its competitors, began featuring hardcore depictions of sexual penetration and oral sex. 

Today, Hustler is still considered more explicit (and more self-consciously lowbrow) than such well-known competitors as Playboy and Penthouse. Hustler frequently depicts hardcore themes, such as the use of sex toys, penetration, oral sex and group sex.

Larry Flynt Publications also licenses the Hustler brand to the Hustler Casino in Gardena, California, which was owned directly by Flynt as an individual through his holding company El Dorado Enterprises. Other enterprises include licensing the Hustler name to the Hustler Club chain of bars and clubs and the Hustler Hollywood store chain that sells adult-oriented videos, clothing, magazines and sex toys. The chain's flagship store is on Sunset Boulevard in West Hollywood. Both licensed enterprises are operated by LFP's partner, Deja Vu.

Founding
The business first began in Cincinnati, where Larry Flynt and his brother, Jimmy Flynt, opened up a store in 1969. Jimmy wrote the check for $5,000 to pay for the club in Cincinnati, and he was listed on the masthead for volume 1, number 1 of the magazine in July 1974. However, Larry fired his brother in 2009, after which Jimmy began developing his own business, Jimmy Flynt's Sexy Gifts Stand. An old member of Hustler magazine has described the relationship, saying, "Larry is the show, and Jimmy makes it go".

Publisher

Hustler is officially published by LFP, Inc, which also produces pornographic films. The abbreviation "L.F.P." originally stood for "Larry Flynt Publications."

A Canadian version of Hustler is published by a Quebec-based firm. This magazine is not owned by Larry Flynt but is licensed to publish material from the American version. In general, Canadian Hustler imitates the appearance and tone of its American counterpart, with Canadian content added. In 1999, the magazine created a minor controversy in Canada by inviting readers to submit sexually explicit stories about Sheila Copps, a left-leaning member of the Liberal cabinet. There have also been Australian, British and South African versions of the magazine.

During a bookstore signing in July 2011, Flynt stated that less than five percent of his income comes from the print magazine; he also speculated that the print magazine would not be around in two to three years.

Regular features
One feature of Hustler is a column called "Asshole of the Month". In every monthly issue of the magazine, a public figure is selected for severe criticism as that month's "asshole". An illustration depicting the criticized person's head emerging from the anus of a cartoon donkey is shown alongside the article. After Flynt's imprisonment in 1977 and his alleged conversion to evangelical Christianity, he promised to reform "Asshole of the Month". However, as of 2016, reform in the feature has yet to be seen.

The centerfold pictorial is called the "Hustler Honey". Occasionally the models are pornographic actresses appearing under a pseudonym; in the mid-80's, actresses and strippers appeared under their more familiar names.

The following is a list of "Hustler Honeys" by month (models listed with only first names are pseudonyms): 

In the 1970s, Hustler ran a comic strip feature entitled "Honey Hooker". In each installment, Honey would have graphic sexual encounters with any male (or female) she ran across. She might be in American colonial times one month and in a Super Bowl locker room the next. This feature was designed to compete against Playboy's Little Annie Fanny and Penthouse's Wicked Wanda. In keeping with Hustler'''s focus on the seamier and less romantic aspects of sexuality, Honey Hooker, unlike Fanny and Wanda, was explicitly portrayed as being a prostitute.

The Beaver Hunt section of the magazine contains explicit nudes of amateur models submitted by readers.

Another Hustler feature that was heavily criticized was the "Chester the Molester" cartoon. Each month's issue depicted Chester, a cartoon middle-aged pedophile, joyfully raping or molesting young girls. After increasing criticism, the cartoon became "Chester and Hester", featuring Hester, an unattractive middle-aged woman who was either Chester's wife or girlfriend.  Following Flynt's alleged religious conversion, he introduced "Chester the Protector", a reincarnation of the molester character who served as a hero to protect young girls from rape and seduction.

A regular feature entitled "Ads We'd Like to See" recreates advertisements of everyday products in a sexualized or violent way. For example, an advertisement in the 1980 issue called 'Doer's Lite Label', a parody of Dewar's Lite Label Whiskey, featured Kenneth Bianchi, the Hillside Strangler. Listed as his greatest accomplishment was Cindy Lee Hudspeth, whom he actually raped and murdered in 1978. He is quoted as saying "You gotta treat 'em rough…". This section was highly criticized for admiring men who had committed sexualized crimes against women.

In addition to its regular features, Hustler occasionally published special features and issues. Examples include the "All Meat" issue from 1978, in which the cover spread depicted a naked woman being fed into a meat grinder upside down. In 1977, the magazine's front page read "First-Time Ever Scratch 'N' Sniff Centerfold".

 Controversy and criticism 
In 1984, conservative academic Judith Reisman received a grant from the Department of Justice to complete a study at American University concerning the cartoons of Playboy, Penthouse, and Hustler, specifically the sexual depictions of minors in these cartoons. She finished the study in 1986 and found that, on average, the number of times per issue that Hustler referred to children, crime, and violence was 46.

Reisman published a nearly 1,600-page report of her findings condemning the sexual depictions of children in pornographic magazines, but her work was met with criticism from her peers. An American University professor, Dr. Myra Sadker, said that she was "very dismayed about the quality of office management and the nature of the research that was going on." Many fellow academics have disputed the neutrality of the research. Avedon Carol, a sex crime researcher and author, said that Reisman's study was a "scientific disaster, riddled with researcher bias."Hustler's chief cartoon artist Dwaine Tinsley was arrested on May 18, 1989, after being accused by his 18-year-old daughter Allison of molesting her since she was thirteen years old. According to court records, he allegedly told his coworkers, "You can't write about this stuff all the time if you don't experience it." Tinsley was found guilty of five counts of child molestation and sentenced to six years in prison although he only spent 23 months behind bars. Tinsley was the artist behind the regular "Chester the Molester" series, which ran from 1976 to 1989.

In a 2012 issue of Hustler, S.E. Cupp, a conservative commentator, was photoshopped and depicted as explicitly performing oral sex. The article describes Cupp as a "lovely young lady who read too much Ayn Rand in high school and ended up joining the dark side... But her hotness is diminished when she espouses dumb ideas like defunding Planned Parenthood." Despite having a disclaimer that the photo was not real, the photograph horrified Cupp, knowing that "this photo will be out there forever." Flynt's response was that the photoshopped image was meant to be satirical: "I'm able to publish this because of the Supreme Court case I won in 1984, Flynt V. Falwell." Cupp did not pursue either Flynt or the magazine because of "free speech". Cupp ultimately chose to "express a little gratitude for Hustler," saying: "I’m completely serious here—there is an accompanying sidebar to this story, in which they lay out why they did this to me. It’s under a hundred words, and in that paragraph they say, ‘S.E. Cupp, she’s lovely, she’s smart, she’s fine, but she happens to be a crazy conservative who is pro-life and wants to defund Planned Parenthood. And for that, she deserves a phallus in her mouth.’ That is essentially what they're saying, and I have to commend that as being incredibly honest.”

 Lawsuits and litigation 
The magazine has had many lawsuits since the 1980s, including claims of defamation and enforcement of sexual violence and behavior. However, there have not been any lawsuits against the magazine or incorporation as of 2016.

In Douglass v. Hustler Magazine Inc. 769 F.2d 1128 (1985), actress Robyn Douglass sued Hustler for defamation and unlawfully placing her under a false light. Douglass posed nude for freelance photographer Augustin Gregory, believing that her photos would appear in an issue of Playboy Magazine. However, Gregory was hired to Hustler and Douglass's photos were published in the 1981 January issue without Douglass's consent. She brought the case to the United States District Court from the North District of Illinois on the basis that the magazine had defamed her name and likeness. The court cases ended in favoring Douglass since the magazine had violated her right of publicity, awarding her $600,000.

In Keeton v. Hustler Magazine, Inc., 465 U.S. 770 (1984) United States supreme court case, Kathy Keeton, vice chairman of Penthouse, sued Hustler for defamation. Keeton brought the case to New Hampshire due its generous six-year statute of limitations for libel and the state believed it was able to support taking jurisdiction due to the magazine's content. The magazine sold up to 15,000 issues since 1975, containing a cartoon where Keeton had received a venereal disease from Robert Guccione, a publisher of Penthouse. Keeton was awarded $2 million for the defamation damages.

At some point between 1974 and 1983, Hustler began mailing the latest issue of the magazine, uninvited and for free, to all of the offices of Members of the United States Congress. Attempts to block the monthly mailings proved unsuccessful after a court ruled in Hustler's favor in United States Postal Service v. Hustler Magazine, Inc. (1986), contending that the publishers had the right to mail the magazine, as the defendants did not “threaten the unique privacy interests that attach in the home.” The practice continues as of April 2014.Hustler Magazine, Inc. v. Falwell, 485 U.S. 46 (1988), is a United States Supreme Court case in which the Court held that the First and Fourteenth Amendments prohibit public figures from recovering damages for the tort of intentional infliction of emotional distress (IIED), if the emotional distress was caused by a caricature, parody, or satire of the public figure that a reasonable person would not have interpreted as factual.

In Herceg v. Hustler  484 U.S. 811 (1989), a family attempted to sue Hustler for the suicide of their fourteen-year-old boy on the basis that its illustrations stimulated violence. Within the magazine's contents was the article "Orgasm of Death", demonstrating practices of erotic asphyxia via photographs in order to heighten sexual pleasure in men. However, Hustler placed disclaimers on the photographs of "Do Not Attempt" to prevent the audience from mimicking the photos. The court case ended in favoring the magazine; the court agreed that the depictions were not forcing readers to perform these erotic or dangerous activities.

 Other venture 

Related magazines
LFP, Inc. publishes several other magazines that use the Hustler brand:

 Hustler's Taboo, specializing in fetishistic material, such as the depiction of sexual bondage and urolagnia
 Barely Legal,  a primarily softcore magazine focusing on models between 18 and 23
 Asian Fever, focusing on Asian models
 Hustler XXX, a more generic hardcore offering
 Chic, an upscale gentleman's magazine featuring nude layouts with lifestyle articles

Websites
In 1995, the company launched Hustler.com. Larry Flynt Productions operates Hustler.com and a number of related sites wherein it sells pictures and videos with content similar to that in its magazines. The site was targeted by Anonymous in Operation Payback in October 2010.

Erotic Movie Awards
During the Golden Age of Porn, and prior to getting into the movie business themselves, Hustler was one of two magazines that announced awards for adult sex films, the other being Adam Film World. They were discontinued in the late 1980s.

The awards were based on fan ballots printed in the publication. In announcing its third annual awards, the magazine said, "Hustlers erotic-movie awards are intended to reward excellence in the erotic-film industry and thereby encourage the fast-buck makers of mediocrity to clean up their act or go out of business."

 1979 (3rd annual) recipients: Best Film – Sex World, Best Actress – Sharon Thorpe in Sex World, Best Actor – John Leslie in Sensual Encounters of Every Kind, Best Director – Anthony Spinelli for Sex World, Best Sex Scene – Harry Reems and Maria Lynn in Butterflies, Most Accomplished Fellatio Artist – Carol Connors in The Erotic Adventures of Candy, Most Accomplished Cunnilinguist – John Leslie in The Other Side of Julie
 1983 (7th annual) recipients: Best Film – The Dancers, Best Actress – Annette Haven in Peaches and Cream, Best Actor – John Leslie in Nothing To Hide, Best Director – Anthony Spinelli for The Dancers, Best Sex Scene – Jamie Gillis and Veronica Hart in Wanda Whips Wall Street, Most Accomplished Fellatio Artist – Annie Sprinkle in Deep Inside Annie Sprinkle, Most Accomplished Cunnilinguist – Annette Haven in Peaches and Cream
 1986' (10th annual) recipients: Best Film – New Wave Hookers, Best Actress – Colleen Brennan in Trinity Brown, Best Actor – Jerry Butler in Snake Eyes, Best Director – Gregory Dark for New Wave Hookers, Best Sex Scene – Traci Lords and Tom Byron in Sister Dearest, Most Accomplished Fellatio Artist – Ginger Lynn in Bedtime Tales, Most Accomplished Cunnilinguist – Danielle in Hostage Girls, Most Disappointing Film – Debbie Does Dallas III''

See also
 List of men's magazines
 List of pornographic magazines

Notes

References

External links

 

Men's magazines published in the United States
Monthly magazines published in the United States
American pornographic film studios
Pornographic magazines published in the United States
Larry Flynt Publications
Magazines established in 1974
Magazines published in California
Mass media in Los Angeles County, California
Obscenity controversies in literature
Pornographic men's magazines
Pornography in Los Angeles
Sexual revolution